Lake Turrach is an Alpine lake at Turracher Höhe Pass, on the state border of Carinthia and Styria in Austria.

Geography

Due to the altitude, it frequently freezes over in winter.

Lake Turrach is fed by a mountain stream and several marshy meadows, the water drains northwards into the Styrian Mur valley at Predlitz. It was the first Carinthian lake to be protected from the discharge of wastewater by a sewage system. Today, several species of fish occur, among them brown trout and arctic char. 

Since 2012 the Carinthian part of the lake belongs to the UNESCO Salzburg Lungau and Nock Mountains biosphere reserve.

External links

 Carinthian Institute of Limnology

Lakes of Carinthia (state)
LTurracher